Anderson de Oliveira da Silva (born 16 July 1998) is a Brazilian professional footballer who plays as a forward for Portimonense.

Professional career
Oliveira made his professional debut with Londrina in a 1-0 Campeonato Brasileiro Série B loss to Juventude on 8 June 2018. On 14 June 2019, Oliveira joined Portimonense in the Primeira Liga.

References

External links
 

1998 births
Living people
Sportspeople from Mato Grosso
Brazilian footballers
Portimonense S.C. players
Londrina Esporte Clube players
Primeira Liga players
Campeonato Brasileiro Série B players
Association football forwards
Brazilian expatriate footballers
Expatriate footballers in Portugal